In Greece, the standard time is Eastern European Time (Greek: Ώρα Ανατολικής Ευρώπης; EET; UTC+02:00). Daylight saving time, which moves one hour ahead to UTC+03:00 is observed from the last Sunday in March to the last Sunday in October. Greece adopted EET in 1916.

Time notation 

The 12-hour notation is used in verbal communication, but the 24-hour format is also used along with the 12-hour notation in writing. The minutes are usually written with two digits; the hour numbers are written with or without a leading zero.

IANA time zone database 
In the IANA time zone database, Greece is given the zone Europe/Athens.

See also 
Time in Europe
List of time zones by country
List of time zones by UTC offset

References

External links 
Current time in Greece at Time.is
Time in Athens, Greece at ConvertWorld.com (in Greek)